

Health status 
Life expectancy in Poland at birth was 74.1 years for men in 2019 and 81.8 for women. In 2019 life expectancy for both sexes reached value 77.86 years. Despite that, the life expectancy in Poland was rapidly increasing in the last 30 years, it is still three years below the European Union average, ranking Poland number 29 on the EU life expectancy list by country in 2016. Cardiovascular diseases and lung cancer are the most notable cases of mortality. 

There are high rates of obesity and a rising burden of mental disorders.

According to the National Health Situation Report 2016, the main causes of death in Poland are: 
 Cardiovascular diseases (45% of all deaths)
 Cancer (25.4% of all deaths)
 Other external reasons: suicide, communication injuries and falls (5.7% of all deaths)
And more specifically, non-communicable diseases which causes most deaths in Poland are:

 Ischemic heart disease
 Stroke
 Lung cancer
 Alzheimer's disease
 Colorectal cancer

Communicable, maternal, neonatal, and nutritional diseases

 Lower respiratory tract infection

Risk factors
Polish population health status and health inequalities combine with many health determinants, including living and working conditions, environmental health, and behavioral risk factors.

Behavioral risk factors 
The National Health Situation Report 2016 points smoking, alcohol abuse and overweight/obesity as the main factors contributing to years of life lost in the disability-adjusted life year scale: 
 smoking takes away 18.6 years of life from men and 7.9 years of life from women;
 alcohol abuse is responsible for the loss of 9.5 years of lives for men and 1.7 years of lives for women. Average alcohol consumption is 10.7 liters per person/year, which is slightly higher than the European average of 10.2 liters
 overweight and obesity is responsible for 9.6 years lost in general. The problem of overweight and obesity exists among 62 – 68% of men and 46 – 60% of women

Smoking 
The legal age for buying tobacco or alcohol is 18.

Smoking itself causes loss of 13.1% of lives, where behavioral factors take away 36% of lives.

A blanket ban on smoking in public places was introduced on 15 November 2010, with a penalty fine of up to 500 zlotys. Smoking is effectively banned on public transport, transport stops and stations, schools and universities, workplaces, sports arenas, and other public places. Owners of pubs, restaurants, and other public spots are obliged to place a visible ‘No Smoking’ sign. 

Smoking rooms, called ‘palarnia’ in Polish, are permitted, but it is not permitted to serve food in them. Municipalities may extend the ban to places such as parks and bus stops.

Alcohol consumption 
The average consumption of alcohol in 2015 was 19.8 liters per year for men and 5.8 liters per year for women. Beer is consumed much more than wine.

Obesity 
Overweight and obesity indicate abnormal or excessive fat growth that presents an upcoming future health risk. A rough measure of obesity among the population is the body mass index (BMI), a person’s weight (in kilograms) divided by the square of height (in meters). A person with a BMI of 30 or more is generally considered obese. A person who has a BMI of 25 or above 25 is deemed to be overweight. Overweight and obesity are major risk factors for many chronic diseases, including diabetes, cardiovascular diseases, and cancer. Once considered a problem only in high-income countries, overweight and obesity are now dramatically rising in low- and middle-income countries, particularly in urban settings.

In 2016, female obesity prevalence in Poland was 22.2%, while male obesity prevalence reached 23.7%.

 From 1997 to 2016, the female 18+ obesity prevalence in Poland increased extensively from 18.1 to 22.2%.

 The male 18+ obesity prevalence in Poland between 1997 and 2016 increased from 14.8% to 23.7%, increasing at an average annual rate of 2.51%.

Health system 
Poland offers a free public healthcare system in which all Polish and European Union residents have the right to access public healthcare, supported by the National Health Fund. 

The organization's public healthcare funds are allocated from an obligatory contribution of all citizens in Poland. The health insurance contribution currently amounts to 9% of individual income. These deductions are the primary source of funding for public and free health insurance. 

However, Poland does offer private health insurance as well. The SARS CoV-2 pandemic has increased interest in private insurance among Poles. After three quarters of 2020, Poles with private health insurance increased by 10.6% year-on-year. The premium value in total exceeded PLN 665 million, the Polish Insurance Association (PIU) has recently announced. More than 3 million Poles already use additional private health insurance. This is more than in the Czech Republic and Germany. During the pandemic, interest in visits to spine specialists and psychological help has increased.

Public spending on healthcare in Poland is among the lowest in the European Union. Polish people pay nearly 10 billion PLN per year on private healthcare, according to a report by INFARMA, an association of pharmaceutical companies.

From 2004 to 2018, Poland's health expenditure as a share of GDP fluctuated substantially, tending to increase, and ending at 6.33% in 2018. Compared to the EU average health spending of 9.85% of GDP in 2018, Poland is still much below standards.

See also
 Health care in Poland

References

 
Alcohol and health